Manuarii Hauata (born March 17, 1994) is a footballer playing for A.S. Central Sport and the Tahiti national football team.

Key International Matches
2015 Pacific Games quarter-final vs Fiji U-23

At the 2015 Pacific Games football playoff to reach the semi-finals, Tahitian Manuarii got booked twice and was given a red card. Meanwhile, despite his red card, Tahiti drew that match with 9 players (Thibaut Pito was also booked twice) resulting in their guaranteed place in the semi-finals.

2015 Pacific Games group stage- vs FS Micronesia U-23

Hauata scored a hat trick in Tahiti's record 30–0 decimation of the  Federated States of Micronesia national under-23 football team at the 2015 Pacific Games.

''2018 FIFA World Cup qualification (OFC) match- vs Solomon Islands

Made his professional international debut when put on for No.18 Tefai Faehau in the 81st minute, playing a mere 9 minutes.

References

External links
  
  

1994 births
Living people
Tahiti international footballers
French Polynesian footballers
Association football midfielders